Avatha simplex  is a species of moth of the family Erebidae. It is found in Sumatra, Peninsular Malaysia and Borneo.

References

External links

Avatha
Moths of Asia
Moths described in 1951